Arthur Allen Casselman (November 2, 1902 – December 11, 1974) was a Canadian politician, who represented the electoral district of Nipissing in the Legislative Assembly of Ontario from 1943 to 1945. He was a member of the Co-operative Commonwealth Federation (CCF). He was born in Finch, Ontario in 1902, the son of George S. Casselman.

References

External links
 

1902 births
1974 deaths
20th-century Canadian legislators
Ontario Co-operative Commonwealth Federation MPPs
People from Nipissing District